Jacob Skeen (born 7 April 1993) is a New Zealand rugby union player. He plays in the lock position for provincial side Waikato and for New Zealand's māori international side the Māori All Blacks.

References

External links
 itsrugby.co.uk profile

1993 births
New Zealand rugby union players
Rugby union locks
Living people
Māori All Blacks players
Waikato rugby union players
People educated at Hamilton Boys' High School
Black Rams Tokyo players
Rugby union players from Waikato